Khushhal Khan was a son of Karim Khan a descendant of Tansen-Mughal court musician. Initially Khushhal Khan entered the court of Raja Rao Ranbha Bahadur a Maratha General of Nizam II army and was later a court musician of Nizam II and later Nizam III. He wrote a musical text Raag Darshan a Persian manuscript in 1808.

References

Indian male composers